Kol Nidre is a prayer of Judaism.

Kol Nidre may also refer to:
 Kol Nidrei (Bruch), a piece of classical music for cello and orchestra by Max Bruch
 Kol Nidre, a work of classical music for chorus and orchestra by Arnold Schoenberg
 Kol Nidre (album), a rock music album by The Electric Prunes